Anomiopus lacordairei is a species of true dung beetle that is endemic to French Guiana, and is only known from Cayenne. It has been recorded from lowland forests, and it may be a myrmecophile.

References

lacordairei
Endemic fauna of French Guiana
Beetles described in 1891